Zdeněk Mejstřík (born 1 January 1948) is a Czech rower. He competed in the men's coxed pair event at the 1964 Summer Olympics.

References

1948 births
Living people
Czech male rowers
Olympic rowers of Czechoslovakia
Rowers at the 1964 Summer Olympics
Rowers from Prague